Century Spring is an album by Mason Jennings. It was released in 2002 on Architect Records and Bar/None.

Critical reception
No Depression wrote that "the songs lean toward folk modesty: quiet strumming, clusters of piano notes laid out like building blocks." PopMatters wrote: "Singer-songwriter aficionados will undoubtedly find Jennings' contemplations of falling in love, falling out of love, and falling in love again, satisfying. Others will be content to keep playing the same 10 singer-songwriter albums they already own."

Track listing 
"Living in the Moment" - 2:05
"Sorry Signs on Cash Machines" - 4:18
"New York City" - 3:22
"Dewey Dell" - 2:08
"Forgiveness" - 3:15
"Century Spring" - 2:06
"Bullet" - 2:41
"Killer's Creek" - 3:24
"East of Eden" - 5:35
"Adrian" - 2:59

Personnel 
Mason Jennings - vocals, guitar, piano (2, 5), bass guitar (6), drums (6)
Noah Levy - drums, percussion 
Bob Skoro - bass guitar (4, 8), piano (4, 8), vocals (4, 8), Fender Rhodes (5)
Ian Mussington - background vocals (2)
Amy Turany - background vocals (7)

References

2002 albums
Mason Jennings albums